Jigariyaa is a Bollywood romantic film. The film is directed by Raj Purohit introducing Harshvardhan Deo and Cherry Mardia in lead roles. The first look of the film was unveiled by Rohit Shetty in Mumbai on 26 August 2014. The film is inspired by true events released on 10 October 2014.

Plot
Inspired from true events, Jigariyaa tells the story of Shyamlal Gupta (Shaamu) and Radhika Sharma (Raadha). Shaamu, the only son of halwaai Ramlal Gupta is a happy go lucky boy based in Agra. He spends his days writing sheyr-o-shayari admired by his motley group of good-for-nothing friends. Radhika, the only daughter of Pandit Shankar Dayal Sharma is a well-educated and caring girl who helps her father in his endeavours as a social do gooder and a man of high reputation in Mathura. Shaamu falls in love with Raadha at first sight, who is visiting her Nani’s house in Agra, thus begins his quest to find this elusive girl in the streets of Agra. As they grow fond and close to each other, the destiny takes another turn and the two lovers break apart.

Cast

 Harshvardhan Deo as Shaamu
 Cherry Mardia as Raadha
 Virendra Saxena as Shaamu's father
 K. K. Raina as Raadha's father
 Navni Parihar as Raadha's mother
 Natasha Rastogi as Shaamu's mother
 Vineeta Malik as Raadha's maternal grandmother
 Deepak Chadha as Raadha's maternal uncle
 Ketan Singh
 Sneha Deori

Soundtrack

Awards and nominations

References

External links 
 
TOI review

2010s masala films
2014 films
2010s Hindi-language films